Matteo Battistini (born 18 February 1994) is an Italian professional footballer who plays as a centre back for  club Lecco.

Club career
Formed on Carrarese youth system, Battistini made his debut with the first team on 24 March 2013 against Gubbio.

On 4 July 2018, Battistini left Pro Piacenza and joined to Pro Patria.

On 21 August 2020 he joined to Serie C club Piacenza.

On 8 July 2021, the defender joined to Serie C club Lecco.

Personal life
Matteo is the son of former footballer Sergio Battistini.

References

External links
 
 

1994 births
Living people
Sportspeople from Como
Footballers from Lombardy
Italian footballers
Association football defenders
Serie C players
Carrarese Calcio players
A.S. Pro Piacenza 1919 players
Aurora Pro Patria 1919 players
Piacenza Calcio 1919 players
Calcio Lecco 1912 players